There are several lists of sail frigates:

 List of Danish sail frigates
 List of Egyptian sail frigates
 List of French sail frigates
 List of German sail frigates
 List of Italian sailing frigates
 List of Netherlands sail frigates
 List of sail frigates of the Ottoman Empire
 List of Russian sail frigates
 List of Spanish sail frigates
 List of Swedish sail frigates
 List of sailing frigates of the United States Navy

Lists of sailing ships
Sail frigates